Isoxathion is a molecular chemical with the molecular formula C13H16NO4PS. It is an insecticide, specifically an isoxazole organothiophosphate insecticide.

References

External links
 Data sheet
 

Acetylcholinesterase inhibitors
Organophosphate insecticides
Isoxazoles
Organothiophosphate esters